Guntur is a city and the administrative headquarters of Guntur district in the Indian state of Andhra Pradesh. Guntur is spread across 168.49 km square and is the third-largest city in the state. The city is the heartland of the state, located in the centre of Andhra Pradesh and making it a central part connecting different regions. It serves as a major hub for exports chilli, cotton and tobacco and has the largest chili market yard in Asia. It is a major transportation, education and commercial hub for the state.

Guntur city is a municipal corporation and also the headquarters of Guntur East and Guntur West mandals in Guntur revenue division. The city region is a major part of Amaravati Metropolitan Region.  census of India the city is the third most populous in the state with a population of 743,354. It is classified as a Y-grade city as per the Seventh Central Pay Commission. It is the 24th most densely populated city in the world and 11th in India. Guntur is estimated to have current population of around 0.9 million.

The city forms a part of the East Coast Economic Corridor, an important industrial corridor in the country. It hosts many state offices and agencies, being part of the district capital and being in close proximity to the state capital Amaravati. The city is about 1100 miles south of the national capital New Delhi. Guntur is known for its chilli, cotton and tobacco exports and has the largest chilli market yard in Asia. The city region is surrounded by many ancient temples and sites that include Kondavidu, Amararama, Caves, Pedakakani.

Etymology 

The earliest reference to the present name of the city can be dated back to the period of Ammaraja–I (922-929 CE), the Vengi Eastern Chalukyan King. It also has its appearance in another two inscriptions dated 1147 AD and 1158 AD. In Sanskrit, Guntur was referred to as Garthapuri. "Garthapuri" or "Guntlapuri" translates to "a place surrounded by water ponds". The settlement might have been near a pond, a "gunta" in Telugu; hence, :gunta uru" translates to "pond village" in Telugu. Another source refers to "kunta" (a land measuring unit) which may have transformed to "kunta uru" and later to "Guntur".

History 

The earliest recorded reference of Guntur comes from the  Ammaraja I (922–929 CE), the Vengi Chalukyan king. The inscriptions stones in the Agastyeshwara temple in 'Naga Lipi' (an ancient script) dates back to about 1100 CE. It is located in Old Guntur and is considered one of the most famous temples in the city. It is said that Agastya built the temple in the last Treta Yuga around the swayambhu linga and hence it has this name. The 'Nagas' were said to have ruled the region at that time. R.Agraharam and Old Guntur areas are considered to be the older parts of the city. The region has been historically known for Buddhism and the first Kalachakra ceremony performed by Gautama Buddha himself. The place of Sitanagaram and the Guttikonda caves are referred in the ancient texts (Vedic puranas) going back to the Treta Yuga and Dvapara Yuga. Old inscriptions of Satavahana period are found in Chebrolu area south of the city.

As India came under the invasions from the west in the last 800 years, Guntur region itself got affected and exploited for its resources by European/foreign colonies. The French shifted their headquarters from Kondaveedu Fort to here in 1752, probably because of the ample availability of water due to the two large tanks. This settlement formed the nucleus of the modern city. The Nizams of Hyderabad and Hyder Ali also ruled the city until it came under British rule in 1788. French astronomer, Pierre Janssen observed the solar eclipse of 18 August 1868 and discovered helium, from Guntur in Madras State, British India. It was made the headquarters of a district named after it that was abolished in 1859, only to be reconstituted in 1904. The city rapidly became a major market for agricultural produce from the surrounding countryside due to the opening of the railway link in 1890. The expansion continued post independence as well and was concentrated in what is now called "New Guntur", with many urban areas such as Brodipet, Arundelpet and suburban areas like Pattabhipuram, Chandramouli Nagar, Sita Rama nagar, Brindavan Gardens, etc.

In 2012, the city limits were expanded with the merger of surrounding ten villages, namely Nallapadu, Pedapalakaluru, Ankireddipalem, Adavitakkellapadu, Gorantla, Pothuru, Chowdavaram, Etukuru, Budampadu and Reddypalem.

Geography 

There are few hills in the surrounding suburban areas and Perecherla Reserve Forest on the north west. The Krishna delta lies partly in the Guntur district. There are other smaller rivers and channels in the region such as Guntur Channel, Chandravanka, Naagileru, Guntur Branch Canal etc.

As quoted in NASA's website "it is typical of the wider deltas along the southeast coast of India (known as the Coromandel Coast). The braided stream channels, broad floodplain, and extensive sandbars suggest that this part of the Krishna River flows through relatively flat terrain and carries a substantial amount of sediment, especially during the monsoon season."

Climate 

As per Köppen-Geiger climate classification system the climate in Guntur is tropical (Aw). The average temperature is warm to hot year-round. The summer season (especially during May and June) has the highest temperatures, but these are usually followed by monsoon rains. The winter season (from November to February) is the most enjoyable with a pleasant climate. Winter months are usually dry, with little to no rainfall. The wettest month is July. Rain storms and cyclones are common in the region during the rainy season, which starts with the monsoons in early June. Cyclones may occur any time of the year, but occur more commonly between May and November.

Demographics 

The 2018 estimate of the city population is estimated to be around 8.5 lakh.

Language and religion 

Telugu is the widely spoken language with a total of  native speakers, followed by  Urdu speakers. A significant minority speak Hindi, Odia and Tamil. The religious population constitute  Hindus (77.91%),  Muslims (18.05%),  Christians (3.25%),  Jains (0.35%) and  (0.82%) not stating any religion. One of the purportedly lost tribes of Israel called Bene Ephraim, has its presence in Guntur, with a Jewish synagogue as well.

Governance

Civic administration and politics 

Guntur municipality is one of the oldest municipalities with more than 150 years of history. It was constituted with 25,000 population in 1866 and later got upgraded to third grade municipality in 1891, first grade in 1917, special grade in 1952 and then to selection grade in 1960. In 1994, it was finally made as municipal corporation and the first ever municipal election was conducted in 1995. In the year 2012, the city limits were expanded by merging ten surrounding villages into the Guntur Municipal Corporation. There are a total 57 revenue wards in the corporation. The present municipal commissioner is Shri Nishant Kumar IAS. Recently the corporation topped the charts in property tax collections in the state.

In the Indian general elections, Guntur Lok Sabha constituency is one among the 25 constituencies in the state to represent the Lok Sabha. While, Guntur East and Guntur West are the two assembly constituencies from 175 assembly segments, representing the state assembly.

State offices 
As part of the Andhra Pradesh Capital Region, the city hosts many state offices and agencies such as Andhra Pradesh Forest Department, Agricultural Marketing Department etc. The state's crime investigative agency (Crime Investigation Dept.) is known as CID. Its regional office is located within the city and its headquarters located in the Guntur Urban district in Mangalari.

Law and order 

Guntur Urban and Rural police offices oversee the law and order for the city and the rural areas surrounding it. The Guntur Urban Police is under consideration to be upgraded as Guntur Police Commissionerate. The NCC Group Guntur is the National Cadet Corps of the Armed forces. It is located at Syamalanagar. The city also hosts one of the Indian Army recruitment and training centres. The city has a new Regional Passport Centre to cater the citizens of the district and state.

The High Court was in Guntur after the separation from the erstwhile Madras State, which was later moved to Hyderabad after the formation of Andhra Pradesh. After the bifurcation of the state a new High Court is set up in the capital region of the district. The AP State Judicial Preview offices are located at Nagarampalem.

Human resources

Healthcare 

The Government General Hospital (GGH) provides free healthcare to people across the district. There are other healthcare facilities like Sankara Eye Hospital that serve people in and around the city. Also there are urban health care centres, couple of hundred private hospitals in the city. The infrastructure for the government hospital is being improved to support increased population of the region.

Public Safety 
As part of the traffic and safety issues Guntur Urban and local police are implementing various measures with latest available technologies.
Threat detection, traffic violations etc. are being monitored with effective surveillance and central monitoring control systems.
Implementation of high resolution cameras are done various important traffic junctions. The businesses and restaurants are encouraged by the city police to increase 
the security and surveillance within their premises as well.

Utility services 
Guntur Channel is the main source of drinking water for the city residents, which draws water from Krishna river through channels and tributaries. Extension of this channel is being planned to cover more areas around the city in the capital region. Summer storage tank at Sangam Jagarlamudi, Vengalayapalem reservoir are the other sources of water to the city. The Andhra Pradesh Southern Power Distribution Company Limited (APSPDCL) is responsible for power supply to the registered service connections through various sub-stations. Guntur is one among the thirty-one cities in the state to be a part of water supply and sewerage services mission known as Atal Mission for Rejuvenation and Urban Transformation (AMRUT). As per the 2018 Swachh Survekshan rankings, the city was ranked 129th in the country, with a score of 2460.18. The corporation received the open defecation free city certificate as part of Swachh Bharat Mission.

Economy 

The city is headquarters to Agricultural Marketing Department. The Tobacco Board, The Spices Board also has their headquarters located in the city. Agriculture Market Committee Market Yard, the largest chilly yard of Asia, generates an income of up to  during trading season. The spiciest Guntur chillies are exported to foreign countries and the city stands second in terms of trade, next to Mexico. Commercial activities are concentrated mostly on outlets such as, cinema halls, malls, jewelry, fertilisers. There are also several spinning mills on the outskirts of the city.

Culture 

The city residents are referred as Gunturians. Traditional drama and theatrical events also have their presence in the city. There are many festivals for literature, poetry, kavi-sammelan in the city. Guntur has many auditoriums such as Venkateswara Vignana Mandiram, Annamaiah Kalavedika etc. to conduct these cultural events. New auditoriums like Kala-pranganam are coming up in Guntur. The city observes many festivals such as Rama Navami, Hanuman Jayanthi, Maha Shivaratri, Vinayaka Chavithi, Vijaya Dasami, Deepawali, Holi, Ugadi, Eid, Krishnastami, Christmas, Karthika Pournami.

Cuisine 

The South Indian breakfast varieties such as Idli, Dosa, Puri, Vada etc., are preferred mostly. The Red chilli biryani is one of the native dish from the area. Guntur Sannam, a chilli variety was registered as one of the geographical indication from Andhra Pradesh under the Geographical Indications of Goods (Registration and Protection) Act, 1999.

The city has many hotels, restaurants for dine in many areas. Also there are lot of street food vendors in every corner of the city. Guntur has many places for lodging and boarding including 5 star hotels. Gongura Pachadi is one of the famous and authentic pickle originated from the City of Guntur.

Cityscape 

The major commercial and residential areas in the city include the Arundelpet, Lakshmipuram and Brodipet. Koretapadu, Navabharath Nagar, Pattabhipuram, Syamala Nagar and Vidya Nagar etc., are some of the other areas in the city. Autonagar, Gorantla, Pedapalakaluru, Nallapadu, Budampadu, Chowdavaram etc. are some of the other areas of the city.

The city has many parks, museums, temples, nature conservation sites, forts, resorts and caves. The Jinnah Tower is one of the iconic structure on Mahatma Gandhi Road, one of the important centres of the city. There are seventeen parks in the city with some of them maintained by the municipal corporation. Larger city parks like Nagara-Vanam are being developed on the outskirts of the city. There are many places to visit nearby the city such as Uppalapadu Bird Sanctuary, Kondaveedu Fort etc. There are many festivals and events in the region such as beach festivals, hill festivals attract the city residents during various festival seasons. The closest beach to the city region is Surya Lanka.

Environment 

The pollution levels in Guntur city are at a moderate levels when compared with other major cities of the Country. There are many efforts being made to increase the awareness and keep the city cleaner. The hundred day clean drive, is a recent drive being taken place to keep the city region clean. Plastic waste to fuel conversion plant is set up in the city. Currently the fuel from the plant is being used for vehicles run by the city municipal corporation.

As part of the waste management, GMC is using electric vehicles for the collection of garbage from the dwellers. Also government is encouraging the residents and local transportations to use electric vehicles for better air quality in the city. e-auto rickshaws are introduced in the city to reduce air and sound pollution. Many electric charging stations are being set up across the city for this purpose. Efforts are being made to reduce plastic usage in the city and bring back the traditional, environment friendly materials. The corporation is encouraging the use of biodegradable materials like jute, paper, cloth and giving incentives with subsidized rates for such usage.

With rapid increase in population and urbanization, Guntur is in dire need of sustainable and strategic planning by the state as well as central governments. The UN agency in a recent study has recommended to the city government to implement larger parks, increase in green space, real need for the introduction of mass transit with metro train and electric bus systems, proper planning of the city expansion etc. There are few nature conservations near the city that are being protected and developed by local government and private agencies such as ITC by planting more trees. These places include hills of Kondaveedu, Uppalapadu, Perechera forest reserve etc. There has been increased interest and awareness to these places by the residents for such things like trekking.

Transportation 

The local transport preferred by the commuters include, privately operated auto rickshaws, cabs, mini-buses etc., and government run APSRTC buses in specified routes. Every day, close to one lakh people travel by different modes of transport. Auto rickshaws operating on a sharing basis are the cheapest form of transport for the students and the working population.

NTR bus station handles more than 2000 buses every day, which arrive from different districts of the state. A new mini bus station built in the premises of NTR bus station is being used to run buses towards Vijayawada to ease the congestion in main bus station. GMC is developing e-Bus Bay centres in the city for the convenience of commuters.

The Rail Vikas Bhavan at Pattabhipuram in the city is the headquarters of Guntur railway division. ,  and  railway stations of the city provide rail transport. While, Perecherla and  railway stations serve as satellite stations to the city commuters. The Guntur railway station operates MEMU and local trains for the commuting population, including thousands of university students.

There had been a proposal to build a no frills airport for the city. The airport located at Gannavaram currently serves some of the air travel needs for the city commuters.

The other arterial city roads include, the Grand Trunk Road, JKC College Road, Lakshmipuram Road, Pattabhipuram Road and Palakaluru Road etc. The city is connected to major destinations by National highways, State highways and district roads. National Highway 16 passes on the eastern side of the city, which is also a part of Asian Highway 45 and Golden Quadrilateral. The National Highway NH167A and State Highway 2 connect the city with Macherla and Hyderabad. National Highway NH544D connects Guntur city with Anantapur and towards Bengaluru by NH44. A new Expressway is proposed connecting the city to Rayalaseema region with faster access. State Highway 48 connects the city with seashore and beaches through  Bapatla and Chirala. The Guntur–Amaravati, Guntur– Nandivelugu, Guntur-Tenali. and Guntur-Parchoor roads are the district roads connecting their respective destinations.

Education and research 

The primary and secondary school education is imparted by government, aided and private schools, under the School Education Department of the state. As per the school information report for the academic year 2015–16, the city limits (including the merged villages) have more than one lakh students enrolled in over 400 schools. The Central Board of Secondary Education, Secondary School Certificate or the Indian Certificate of Secondary Education are the different types of syllabi followed by different schools. The medium of instruction followed by schools are Telugu, English and Urdu. The public library system is supported by the government with the central library located at Arundalpet.

Government colleges and institutions include, Guntur Medical College, Government Junior College for Girls. There exists one residential college under APRJC, ten private aided, two co-operative and many private unaided colleges. Hindu College, A.C College are some of the older institutes in the city. JKC College, RVR & JC College of Engineering, Tellakula Jalayya Polisetty Somasundaram College (TJPS College), Government College for Women and St. Joseph's College of Education for Women are the autonomous colleges approved under Universities Grant Commission scheme. The AIIMS in Mangalagiri is a central medical institute near the city region. The Agricultural University at Lam village is administered from Gorantla area of the city. The Acharya Nagarjuna University, a state university located at Namburu, affiliates many colleges and institutes of the city. Research centres related to different fields such as, Regional AGMARK laboratory, regional station of Central Tobacco Research Institute of Indian Council of Agricultural Research are also present. The city hosts many national, state level conferences and expos on many topics like economy, agriculture, technology etc. The first Agri Infotech expo for the state is being held at the university campus at Guntur to make use of the latest technologies and adhering to traditional organic farming practices.

Information Technology centres are setup in and around the city institutes to facilitate IT company employees with 'IT Work from Town Centres'. The centres are equipped with better network speed, uninterrupted power supply.

Media 

As per the 58th annual report of Press India 2013–14, the major Telugu daily publications from Guntur are Andhra Jyothi, Eenadu, Andhra Prabha, Sakshi, Suryaa, Telugu Jatiya Dinapatrika Vaartha. The English publications are, Deccan Chronicle, News Boom, The Fourth Voice, Views Observer.

Sports 

Sporting infrastructure of the city include several venues for many sports such as, Brahmananda Reddy stadium for Tennis, Badminton, Volleyball, Athletics, Gymnastics, Swimming; NTR Municipal Indoor stadium for Table Tennis and Volleyball; and also other sports such as Boxing. It becomes the first state to get blue athletic track in India

The city has hosted sporting events such as, All India Senior Tennis Association, All India Sub Junior Ranking Badminton Tournament, All India Invitation Volleyball Tournament, Ganta Sanjeeva Reddy Memorial Trophy, Inter-district Master Aquatic Championship etc. The city was also a host for Khelo India programme for junior level national sports. City hosts mini marathons and walks such as 10K-Walk in and around the city region.

International sports personalities from the city include: cricketer Ambati Rayudu; badminton player Srikanth Kidambi, who won the Super Series title in China and also finished as a quarter finalist at the 2016 Summer Olympics.

See also 
 Amaravati
Andhra Pradesh Reorganisation Act, 2014
 List of cities in Andhra Pradesh

References

External links 

 Guntur Municipal Corporation

 
Towns in Guntur district
Cities in Andhra Pradesh
Mandal headquarters in Guntur district
District headquarters of Andhra Pradesh
Cities in Andhra Pradesh Capital Region